Pennsylvania's state elections were held November 7, 2006. Necessary primary elections were held on May 16, 2006.

Governor

Lt. Governor

Senate

State Senate

Pennsylvania House of Representatives

Ballot Question

References

2006 Pennsylvania elections
Pennsylvania